Where the Action Is! Los Angeles Nuggets: 1965–1968 is the fifth box set in Rhino Records' Nuggets series, released September 22, 2009. The set's four discs each focus on a different aspect of the underground rock music scene in and around Los Angeles at the end of the 1960s. The first disc, "On the Strip", features bands that rose out of the Sunset Strip scene; disc two, "Beyond the City", focuses on bands from the surrounding areas outside the city's borders; disc three, "The Studio Scene" covers bands' attempts to exploit the Los Angeles sound for a commercial audience; while disc four presents the movement away from psychedelic and garage rock towards the country rock sound which became popular in the city late in the decade. The boxed set was compiled and curated by Los Angeles native, Andrew Sandoval. On December 1, 2010 this project was nominated for a Grammy Award in the best Historical album category.

Track listing

Disc one: "On the Strip"
 "Riot on Sunset Strip" – The Standells
 "You Movin'" – The Byrds
 "You I'll Be Following" – Love
 "Dr. Stone" – The Leaves
 "Go and Say Goodbye" – Buffalo Springfield
 "Zig Zag Wanderer" – Captain Beefheart & His Magic Band
 "Gentle as It May Seem" – Iron Butterfly
 "Candy Cane Madness" – Lowell George & The Factory
 "If You Want This Love" – The West Coast Pop Art Experimental Band
 "Baby My Heart" – The Bobby Fuller Four
 "All Night Long" – The Palace Guard
 "It's Gonna Rain" – Sonny & Cher
 "For My Own" – The Guilloteens
 "Take a Giant Step" – The Rising Sons
 "One Too Many Mornings" – The Association
 "Time Waits for No One" – The Knack
 "Take It as It Comes" – The Doors
 "Pulsating Dream" – Kaleidoscope
 "Tripmaker" – The Seeds
 "The People In Me" – The Music Machine
 "Saturday's Son" – The Sons of Adam
 "Eventually" – The Peanut Butter Conspiracy
 "Swim" – Penny Arkade
 "The Third Eye" – The Joint Effort
 "Girl in Your Eye" – Spirit

Disc two: "Beyond the City"
 "Jump, Jive & Harmonize" – Thee Midniters
 "Back Up" – The Light
 "To Die Alone" – The Bush
 "Get on This Plane" – The Premiers
 "Little Girl, Little Boy" – The Odyssey
 "Hideaway" – The Electric Prunes
 "Listen, Listen!" – The Merry-Go-Round
 "She Done Moved" – The Spats
 "Grim Reaper of Love" – The Turtles
 "See If I Care" – Ken & The Fourth Dimension
 "He's Not There Anymore" – The Chymes
 "Back Seat ‘38 Dodge" – Opus 1
 "Eternal Prison" – The Humane Society
 "Revenge" – The Others
 "Come Alive" – Things to Come
 "Acid Head" – The Velvet Illusions 
 "Guaranteed Love" – Limey & the Yanks
 "Love's the Thing" – The Romancers (aka The Smoke Rings)
 "Underground Lady" – Kim Fowley
 "Pretty Little Thing" – The Deepest Blue
 "You're Wishin' I Was Someone Else" – The Whatt Four
 "Hippy Elevator Operator" – The W.C. Fields Memorial Electric String Band
 "That's for Sure" – The Mustangs
 "Tomorrow's Girl" – Fapardokly (Merrell & the Exiles)
 "Everything's There" – The Hysterics
 "Our Time Is Running Out" – The Yellow Payges

Disc three: "The Studio Scene"
 "Action, Action, Action" – Keith Allison
 "The Rebel Kind" – Dino, Desi & Billy
 "High on Love" – The Knickerbockers
 "Fan Tan" – Jan & Dean
 "Halloween Mary" – P. F. Sloan
 "Somebody Groovy" – The Mamas & the Papas
 "Daydreaming" – Thorinshield
 "Just Can't Wait" – The Full Treatment
 "Yellow Balloon" – The Yellow Balloon
 "The Times to Come" – London Phogg
 "No More Running Around" – The Lamp of Childhood
 "Little Girl Lost-and-Found" – The Garden Club
 "Mothers and Fathers" – The Moon
 "My Girlfriend Is a Witch" – October Country
 "Montage Mirror" – Roger Nichols Trio
 "Flower Eyes" – Pasternak Progress
 "Come Down" – The Common Cold
 "Jill" – Gary Lewis & the Playboys
 "Daily Nightly" – The Monkees
 "Night Time Girl" – Modern Folk Quintet
 "Don't Say No" – The Oracle
 "Tin Angel (Will You Ever Come Down)" – Hearts and Flowers
 "Rainbow Woman" – Lee Hazlewood
 "Poor Old Organ Grinder" – Pleasure featuring Billy Elder
 "Baby, Please Don't Go" – The Ballroom

Disc four: "New Directions"
 "Sit Down, I Think I Love You" – Stephen Stills and Richie Furay
 "Splendor in the Grass" – Jackie DeShannon with The Byrds
 "November Night" – Peter Fonda
 "Roses and Rainbows" – Danny Hutton
 "Lemon Chimes" – The Dillards
 "Here's Today" – The Rose Garden
 "I Love How You Love Me" – Nino Tempo & April Stevens
 "Words" (demo) – Boyce and Hart
 "(You Used To) Ride So High" – The Motorcycle Abeline (Warren Zevon & Bones Howe)
 "Los Angeles" – Gene Clark
 "Once Upon a Time" – Tim Buckley
 "Darlin' You Can Count on Me" – The Everpresent Fullness
 "I'll Search the Sky" – The Nitty Gritty Dirt Band
 "Come to the Sunshine" – Van Dyke Parks
 "Heroes and Villains" (alternate take) – The Beach Boys
 "She Sang Hymns Out of Tune" – Jesse Lee Kincaid
 "Sister Marie" – Nilsson
 "Last Night I Had a Dream" – Randy Newman
 "Life Is a Dream" – Noel Harrison
 "Marshmallow Skies" – Rick Nelson
 "I Think I Love You" – Del Shannon
 "Change Is Now" – The Byrds
 "The Truth Is Not Real" – Sagittarius
 "You Set the Scene" – Love
 "Inner-Manipulations" – Barry McGuire

References

Nuggets series albums
2009 compilation albums
Music of Los Angeles
Psychedelic rock compilation albums
Acid rock compilation albums
Garage rock compilation albums
Albums produced by Andrew Sandoval